Live in Glasgow is a Live album by Paul Rodgers of Free, Bad Company and Queen + Paul Rodgers fame. A DVD of the same name and concert was also released in May 2007.

Tracks
 "I'll Be Creepin'"  (Paul Rodgers, Andy Fraser) - 4:27
 "The Stealer"  (Rodgers, Paul Kossoff, Fraser) - 3:32
 "Ride on a Pony"  (Rodgers, Fraser) - 4:21
 "Radioactive"  (Rodgers) - 3:44
 "Be My Friend" (Rodgers, Fraser) - 6:22
 "Warboys (A Prayer for Peace)"  (Rodgers) - 3:46
 "Feel Like Makin' Love"  (Rodgers, Mick Ralphs) - 4:52
 "Bad Company"  (Rodgers, Simon Kirke) - 5:21
 "I Just Want to See You Smile"  (Rodgers) - 3:36
 "Louisiana Blues"  (Muddy Waters) - 3:28
 "Fire and Water"  (Rodgers, Fraser) - 4:17
 "Wishing Well"  (Rodgers, Kossoff, John "Rabbit" Bundrick, Kirke) - 3:29
 "All Right Now"  (Rodgers, Fraser) - 6:27
 "I'm a Mover"  (Rodgers, Fraser) - 3:06
 "The Hunter"  (Steve Cropper, Donald "Duck" Dunn, Al Jackson, Booker T. Jones, Carl Wells) - 4:25
 "Can't Get Enough"  (Ralphs) - 4:35
 "Seagull"  (Rodgers, Ralphs) - 3:46

Personnel
 Paul Rodgers - lead vocals, guitar, piano
 Howard Leese - guitar, backing vocals
 Kurtis Dengler - guitar
 Lynn Sorensen - bass, backing vocals
 Ryan Hoyle - drums

Trivia
 The album is dedicated to Joe Bradley (Rodgers' first manager), Boz Burrell, Ahmet Ertegün and Henk Huffener.
 The album packaging features quotes from Jimmy Page and Brian May.
 The corresponding DVD was Rodgers' first solo DVD release.
 The song "Warboys (A Prayer for Peace)" is a new song. It was later recorded by Queen + Paul Rodgers for their studio album The Cosmos Rocks.

References

Paul Rodgers albums
2007 live albums